Espen Bjervig (born June 30, 1972) is a former Norwegian cross-country skier who competed from 1995 to 2004. He won a silver medal in the 4 × 10 km relay at the 1999 FIS Nordic World Ski Championships in Ramsau and earned his best individual finish of eight in the 10 km event in those same championships.

Bjervig also won four races of distances up to 15 km from 1997 to 2004. In June 2018, he was appointed as the Norwegian Ski Federation's managing director of cross-country. He had previously worked as sales director for a number of companies and as a marketing director for the Norwegian Ski Federation. Bjervig graduated from the BI Norwegian Business School in 1998, with a Master's degree in Finance.

Cross-country skiing results
All results are sourced from the International Ski Federation (FIS).

World Championships
 1 medal – (1 silver)

World Cup

Season standings

Individual podiums
1 victory
6 podiums

Team podiums

 3 victories 
 7 podiums 

Note:   Until the 1999 World Championships, World Championship races were included in the World Cup scoring system.

References

External links

Norwegian male cross-country skiers
1972 births
Living people
FIS Nordic World Ski Championships medalists in cross-country skiing